Over Now may refer to:

 "Over Now" (Alice in Chains song), a 1996 song by Alice in Chains
 "Over Now" (Calvin Harris and the Weeknd song), a 2020 song by Calvin Harris and the Weeknd
 "Over Now", a 2018 song by Post Malone from Beerbongs & Bentleys